Matović (Cyrillic script: Матовић) is a Serbian patronymic surname. It may refer to:

Darjan Matović (born 1988), goalkeeper
Dušan Matović (born 1983), footballer
Ivana Matović (born 1983), basketball player
Vera Matović, singer
Igor Matovič, Slovak politician, former Prime Minister of Slovakia

Serbian surnames
Patronymic surnames